Sir John Swinburne, 7th Baronet (1831 – 15 July 1914) was a British Baronet and Liberal politician.

Life
The third son of Edward Swinburne and his wife Anna Antonia Sutton, a granddaughter of Sir Richard Sutton, 1st Baronet, he succeeded his grandfather Sir John Edward Swinburne, 6th Baronet in 1860.

Swinburne was High Sheriff of Northumberland in 1866  and the Member of Parliament for Lichfield, Staffordshire, between 1885 and 1892. In the 1895 general election he stood as the parliamentary candidate for the Liberal Party in Newbury, but was not elected.

His daughter, Rahmeh Theodora Swinburne, married General Percy Radcliffe.

See also
 Swinburne Baronets

References
 The Swinburn Family of Capheaton in Northumberland at www.geocities.com

Notes

External links 
 

1831 births
1914 deaths
Baronets in the Baronetage of England
Liberal Party (UK) MPs for English constituencies
UK MPs 1885–1886
UK MPs 1886–1892
High Sheriffs of Northumberland